Denys Serhiyovych Kesil (born 26 October 2000) is a Ukrainian swimmer. He represented Ukraine at the 2019 World Aquatics Championships held in Gwangju, South Korea. In the same year, he won the silver medal in the men's 200 metre butterfly event at the 2019 Military World Games held in Wuhan, China.

In 2018, he represented Ukraine at the Summer Youth Olympics in Buenos Aires, Argentina. He won the silver medal in the boys' 200 metre butterfly event. He also competed in the boys' 50 metre butterfly and boys' 100 metre butterfly events.

References

External links
 

Living people
2000 births
Ukrainian male swimmers
Male butterfly swimmers
Swimmers at the 2018 Summer Youth Olympics
Swimmers at the 2020 Summer Olympics
Olympic swimmers of Ukraine
Sportspeople from Kryvyi Rih
21st-century Ukrainian people